The Academy of Science and Entrepreneurship (previously named "Bloomington New Tech High School") is a high school in Bloomington, Indiana, United States which utilizes Project Based Learning. The Academy opened in fall 2008 with a class size of 96 students, the school serves students in 9th-12th grades, and at the beginning, added a class each year, with up to 100 students per grade. In May 2009, the class of 2012 had 50-65 students, and 58 Students graduated in the class of 2012. The school has a 1:1 student to computer ratio. While this was remarkable at the creation of the school it has since become the standard across MCCSC.

History
The Academy of Science and Entrepreneurship in Bloomington, Indiana is part of the larger New Tech Network, which includes over 100 schools across the United States. The school is funded through district funds, state grants, and community donations. The Academy building was originally the Rogers Building Supplies main building. It was renovated to become a school. In 2018, The Academy received STEM certification by the Indiana Department of Education.

The New Tech model is characterized by three principles:
 A new instructional approach that engages learners;
 A culture that empowers students and teachers; and
 Fully applied technology that supports deep learning.

The Academy also follows three main school norms - Trust, Respect, and Responsibility.

Campus
The Academy is located on the near west side of Bloomington, off of Patterson st.  Both the school campus and the surrounding area have seen a host of improvements over the past few years.  In the summer of 2013, major work was done on the school campus, adding a number of features including new signage, landscaping, a new parking lot, a picnic shelter and outdoor benches, and a basketball court.  During the 2013–14 school year, the "Green Pioneers" group (with help from the community) installed a rain garden to capture the runoff from the school roof, and reduce the amount of stormwater that went into the city sewers.

Curriculum
New Tech uses project-based learning to engage students in relevant and meaningful work. Much of the classwork is done on computers. The school uses Instructure's Canvas and Gmail/Google Drive for assignment management, grades, and collaboration. Prior to the use of Canvas, New Technology Foundation's Echo Collaborative Learning Environment was used. In the first year, before echo was finalized, the American Studies class used the Moodle virtual learning environment.

The following classes were available in 2022:
American Studies - a combination of American History and English 9.
World Studies - a combination of World History and English 10.
English 11
English 12
Software Technology & Success Skills - teaches students software applications (mainly from Microsoft) and skills that help students get jobs.
Biology & Health
Environmental Science
Botany
Zoology
Epidemiology
Chemistry
Physics
PLTW Intro to Engineering & Design
PLTW Principles Of Engineering
PLTW Civil Engineering & Architecture
PLTW Principles of Biomedical Sciences
PLTW Human Body Systems
Math Core
Algebra II
Pre Calculus/Trigonometry
Entrepreneurship - class is responsible for running the school store.
Spanish: Levels 1-3
Art - This class can be taken as a Dual Credit Course, earning both High School and Ivy Tech credit.
Government
Economics
Service Learning Classes (Teaching Assistants, Recycling, etc.)
IVYT111 - An Ivy Tech class taught on-site at ASE.
English 111
Ivy Tech Release - Allows students to take classes on the local Ivy Tech campus.
Film as Literature
Dramatic Literature
Physical Education

Extracurricular activities
Many extracurricular activities are available at The Academy of Science and Entrepreneurship including but not limited to:
Business Professionals of America
National Honor Society
Spanish Club
Space Club(Paused due to covid, never resumed)
Robotics Club(Paused due to covid, never resumed)
Student Leadership Team
The Academy Theater Company
Chess Club
Art Club
Environmental Club
Dance Club
Students may also participate in the activities of their "home school".  Many Academy students have been in band, theater, or on sports teams at Bloomington North or South.

References

 Bloomington New Tech High School. MCCSC. 7 May 2009

External links
 The Academy of Science and Entrepreneurship - Homepage

Educational institutions established in 2008
Public high schools in Indiana
Schools in Monroe County, Indiana
2008 establishments in Indiana